Paralepetopsis is a genus of sea snails, the true limpets, marine gastropod mollusks in the family Neolepetopsidae.

Species
Species within the genus Paralepetopsis include:
 Paralepetopsis clementensis McLean, 2008
 Paralepetopsis ferrugivora Warén & Bouchet, 2001
 Paralepetopsis floridensis McLean, 1990
 Paralepetopsis lepichoni Warén & Bouchet, 2001
 Paralepetopsis rosemariae Beck, 1996
 Paralepetopsis sasakii Warén & Bouchet, 2009
 Paralepetopsis tunnicliffae McLean, 2008

References

External links

Neolepetopsidae